Hunt Armory (also known as Pittsburgh Armory) is a former armory located at 324 Emerson Street in the Shadyside neighborhood of Pittsburgh, Pennsylvania. It was designed by Pittsburgh architects W.G. Wilkins Co.  Announced on August 29, 1909 and budgeted at $450,000 ($ in present-day terms) it was completed by 1916. The armory was named after Spanish–American War hero, metallurgist, and industrialist Captain Alfred E. Hunt (1855–1899), best known for founding the company that would eventually become Alcoa, the world's largest producer and distributor of aluminum.

For many years, it was used (along with the Syria Mosque) as the city's main auditorium.  Until the Pittsburgh Civic Arena was completed in 1961, the Hunt Armory was the largest auditorium in Pittsburgh and was frequently the host for concerts and political events including:
October 20, 1944: Presidential candidate Thomas E. Dewey.
October 23, 1948: President Harry S. Truman with a crowd of over 25,000.
September 7 - October 4, 1952: Billy Graham's Pittsburgh crusade.
October 27, 1952: Presidential candidate Dwight D. Eisenhower.
October 30, 1952: Presidential candidate Adlai Stevenson.
October 9, 1956: President Eisenhower.
October 31, 1956: Presidential candidate Adlai Stevenson speaks to 12,000.

The Armory is closed for military use, but continues to be used for other purposes. In 2008, it hosted the Handmade Arcade.

By 2015, historically appropriate redevelopment was being planned under the City's Urban Redevelopment Authority (URA). In November 2021, the site opened as a public skating rink, becoming the first indoor community ice rink opened within the city of Pittsburgh in 25 years.

Hunt Armory has been listed in the National Register of Historic Places since November 14, 1991. It received City of Pittsburgh historic landmark status on February 27, 2014.

See also
National Register of Historic Places listings in Allegheny County, Pennsylvania

References

External links
 

Armories on the National Register of Historic Places in Pennsylvania
Pennsylvania National Guard
Indoor arenas in Pennsylvania
Buildings and structures in Pittsburgh
Infrastructure completed in 1916
National Register of Historic Places in Pittsburgh
Event venues on the National Register of Historic Places in Pennsylvania